Pinus tabuliformis, also called Manchurian red pine, Southern Chinese pine or Chinese red pine, is a pine native to northern China and northern Korea.

Description
The growth rate is fast when young, but slows with age. The gray-brown bark fissures at an early age compared to other trees. The broadly spreading shape is very pronounced, in part due to the long horizontal branching pattern.

Varieties 
There are two varieties:
Pinus tabuliformis var. tabuliformis. China, except for Liaoning. Broadest cone scales under 15 mm broad.
Pinus tabuliformis var. mukdensis. Liaoning, North Korea. Broadest cone scales over 15 mm broad.

Some botanists also treat the closely related Henry's pine (Pinus henryi) and Sikang pine (Pinus densata) as varieties of Chinese red pine; in some older texts even the very distinct Yunnan pine (Pinus yunnanensis) is included as a variety.

Taxonomy
In some older texts the name is spelled "Pinus tabulaeformis".

The specific epithet, tabuliformis ('table-shaped'), refers to the species' flat-topped crown.

Distribution and habitat
The species can be found in northern China from Liaoning west to Inner Mongolia and Gansu, and south to Shandong, Henan and Shaanxi, as well as northern Korea.

Uses
The wood is used for general construction. The pulpwood produces certain resins that are used as artificial vanilla flavouring (vanillin). The resin is also used to make turpentine and related products, and is used medicinally to treat a variety respiratory and internal ailments, such as kidney and bladder upsets, wounds, and sores. The bark is a source of tannin. Medicinal use of the pine needles also takes place, which also contain a natural insecticide, as well as a source for a dye. The needles are used to brew pine needle tea (sollip-cha).

Its cultivation is uncommon outside of China, grown only in botanical gardens.

References

External links

Photos of cones (scroll half-way down)
Photos of foliage
Plants for a future – uses

Tabuliformis
Trees of China
Flora of Korea
Taxa named by Élie-Abel Carrière